Rectilabrum is a genus of ectoparasitic sea snails, marine gastropod mollusks in the family Eulimidae.

Species
 Rectilabrum lanceolatum Bouchet & Warén, 1986

References

 Bouchet P. & Warén A. (1986). Revision of the Northeast Atlantic bathyal and abyssal Aclididae, Eulimidae, Epitonidae (Mollusca, Gastropoda). Bollettino Malacologico Suppl. 2: 297-576

External links
 To World Register of Marine Species

Eulimidae